Anna Favetti is a 1938 German romantic drama film directed by Erich Waschneck and starring Brigitte Horney, Mathias Wieman and Gina Falckenberg. The screenplay was written by Walter von Hollander, adapted from his own novel Licht im dunklen Haus. It was made at the Babelsberg Studios in Potsdam. Location filming took place in Italy and Switzerland. The film's sets were designed by the art director Gustav A. Knauer.

Cast
 Brigitte Horney as Anna Favetti
 Mathias Wieman as Hemmstreet
 Gina Falckenberg as Irene Hemmstreet
 Maria Koppenhöfer as Frau Favetti
 Friedrich Kayßler as Herr Favetti
 Karl Schönböck as Kingston
 Elsa Wagner as Frau Stetius
 Franz Schafheitlin as Dr. Thom
 Jeanette Bethge as Bertha
 Paul Bildt as Dr. Fister
 Beppo Brem as Billy Blake
 Rolf Wernicke as Reporter
 Edwin Jürgensen as Empfangschef
 Erwin Biegel as Kellner im Café
 Hubert von Meyerinck as Hotelgast
 Annemarie Korff as Dr. Thoms Sekretärin
 Eva Sommer as Backfisch im Hotel
 F.W. Schröder-Schrom as Professor der Jury
 Charlotte Schultz as Portiersfrau

References

Bibliography
 
 Klaus, Ulrich J. Deutsche Tonfilme: Jahrgang 1938. Klaus-Archiv, 1988.

External links

1938 films
German romantic drama films
1930s German-language films
Films directed by Erich Waschneck
Films based on German novels
Films of Nazi Germany
UFA GmbH films
German black-and-white films
1938 romantic drama films
1930s German films
Films shot at Babelsberg Studios